The Mystery of the Missing Man, published 1956, is the thirteenth novel in the Five Find-Outers written by Enid Blyton and originally illustrated by Lilian Buchanan.

Characters

Fatty(Frederick) – The chief of the Five Find-Outers and Dog.
Daisy – A member of the Five Find-Outers and Dog.
Bets – The youngest member of the Five Find-Outers and Dog.
Larry – The former chief of the Five Find-Outers and Dog.
Pip – A member of the Five Find-Outers and Dog.
Buster – A dog owned by Fatty.
Mr. Goon – The local Peterswood policeman.
Eunice – The daughter of Fatty's father friend, Mr Tolling.
Chief Inspector Jenks – A friend of the Five Find-Outers and Dog.
Bert – The clown at the fair.
Josef – An employee at the fair.
Lucita – An employee at the fair.
Harris – The criminal in the story.
Mr Tolling – A friend of Fatty's father, he is also a coleopterist.

Summary
Fatty, the leader of the Find-Outers  receives news from Chief Inspector Jenks, that a dangerous criminal is on the run, who is also a master of disguise and has an interest in insects. Unfortunately, his father's friend daughter, Eunice, is making Fatty off his concentration for the mystery. But soon Eunice help Fatty in solving the mystery when she knows him better. Fatty suspects that the criminal will be in the fair held in the village. Fatty and the others try to investigate suspicious people at the fair such as Bert The clown, Josef, Lucita and their sad grandmother, with a little help of Eunice they found out Josef and Lucita were holding the criminal in their caravan

Plot
The thirteenth book in the series introduces Mr Tolling, an old school friend of Fatty's father who comes to spend a week with the Trottevilles so he can attend the coleopterists' conference at a fair in Peterswood. Coleopterists are of course beetle-lovers, and not (as the gang joke) owners of collie dogs, growers of cauliflowers, or sufferers from colly-wobbles. Mr Tolling is rather like a beetle himself, a small man with a huge black beard, large glasses and always wearing a dark suit. He's very likeable, even if he is a little boring, always going on about beetles and how fascinating they are. He's extremely eager to get along to the coleopterist meetings, which are being held at Petersood's Town Hall.

But Mr Tolling—or Mr Belling as Fatty mistakenly calls him at first—pales into insignificance compared to his daughter Eunice, who has come along to stay with the Trottevilles as well. Fatty is supposed to entertain her during her stay, and she's ready and willing to join in with whatever Fatty and his friends are doing, but she's domineering, and her highly efficient, extremely helpful attitude for some reason rubs Fatty and the others up the wrong way. In short, she's "simply awful." When Fatty mistakenly called her father Mr Belling (because bells toll), she responds by suggesting she call him Frederick Canterville instead. Throughout the book she is smart and witty, but Fatty doesn't want her overbearing company and politely escapes wherever possible.

The mystery starts when Fatty dresses up as a tramp in an effort to shake off Eunice. He puts on his disguise and then hides out in his shed—and Eunice peers in through the window and screams at the sight of "an intruder in Fatty's shed!". Mr Goon is nearby and comes to the rescue, demanding that the tramp show himself, so poor Fatty bursts out of the shed and takes off with Buster, who is barking excitedly around his feet. Naturally Mr Goon makes out afterwards that the tramp was strong, very strong, and Buster must have taken large chunks out of the tramp's ankles as he tried to escape.

Chief Inspector Jenks visits Goon and tells him to be on the lookout for a dangerous escaped criminal, who has a nasty scar above his lip but is a master of disguise so can hide it pretty well with a beard. An astonished Mr Goon realises the tramp might be the man they're after.

The mystery in this book is: Where is the criminal? Is he in disguise, and if so, who is he?

Edition 
 2014 by Egmont, Cover by Timothy Banks.

Novels by Enid Blyton
1956 British novels
1956 children's books
Novels about missing people
Methuen Publishing books